The Tajikistan national football team (Timi milliji futboli Toçikiston) represents Tajikistan in international football and is controlled by the Tajikistan Football Federation, the governing body for football in Tajikistan. Tajikistan's home ground is the Pamir Stadium in Dushanbe.

History
After the breakup of the Soviet Union, Tajikistan played its first match against Uzbekistan on 17 June 1992. It was not until 1994 that the Tajikistan National Football Federation was admitted to FIFA.

Tajikistan played its first official game on 11 April 1994 in Tashkent as part of a regional tournament. They lost that game against Kazakhstan 0–1. The first official competition the team entered was the qualifiers for the 1996 Asian Cup, when it was seeded in the three-team Group 8 with Uzbekistan and Bahrain. Bahrain later withdrew, leaving Tajikistan to a play-off against their Middle Asian neighbors. Tajikistan won the first game 4–0, but were beaten in the away game 0–5 after extra time. They did not enter a World Cup qualifying competition until the France 1998 edition, recording four victories in their preliminary group stage including a 5–0 triumph over Turkmenistan, and losing only to China, which placed them second behind their eastern neighbors, but out of the competition.

In a three-team qualifying section for Korea/Japan 2002, they had a record 16–0 win over Guam before losing 2–0 to Iran. After beating Bangladesh 4–0 on aggregate in the preliminary round of the qualifiers for Germany 2006, they held AFC Asian Cup semi-finalists and eventual group winners Bahrain to a goalless draw on 31 March 2004.

The team won its first international tournament, the inaugural AFC Challenge Cup, in 2006, beating Sri Lanka 4–0 in Dhaka.

Following Tajikistan's disappointing 2018 World Cup qualifying campaign, Mubin Ergashev and his staff were relieved of their duties.

Tajikistan were drawn into a 2019 Asian Cup qualification group with the Philippines, Yemen and Nepal. Following their defeat to Philippines on 27 March 2018, confirming Tajikistan's failure to qualify for the Asian Cup, manager Khakim Fuzailov resigned.

Due to the unsuccessful performance of Tajikistan in recent years, Usmon Toshev, the Uzbek coach, was appointed to reinvigorate the Tajik side. Under Usmon, Tajikistan performed well in the 2022 FIFA World Cup qualifying, managing to beat neighbor Kyrgyzstan 1–0 and holding the same opponent 1–1 away. However, Tajikistan suffered a heartbreaking shock 3–4 loss to minnows Myanmar away, in what was considered to be a shock given Myanmar's poor form in early games, thus putting Tajikistan into trouble. Ultimately, with the withdrawal of North Korea, Tajikistan paid dearly when its points against Mongolia were not counted, thus following Tajikistan 1–4 away loss to Japan, an Asian powerhouse, Tajikistan was officially out of the 2022 FIFA World Cup. Eventually, despite Myanmar replacing Mongolia to finish bottom thus added six points for Tajikistan, the Tajiks could not reduce the deficit due to poor goal difference and thus missed out on the final round.

After failing to have a direct spot for the 2023 AFC Asian Cup, Tajikistan hired German-Croatian manager Petar Segrt, and Tajikistan took part in the 2023 AFC Asian Cup qualification – Third Round, joining with old foes Myanmar and Kyrgyzstan, as well as another Southeast Asian rival Singapore. Due to COVID-19 pandemic, the third round was played only in a single round-robin group format with a centralised host, which Tajikistan's group saw its neighbour Kyrgyzstan hosting it. Tajikistan was able to take advantage from this proximity and defeated both Myanmar (4–0) and Singapore (1–0), before holding neighbour Kyrgyzstan in a goalless draw, topping the group and, after failing in five previous attempts, Tajikistan was able to qualify to its first-ever AFC Asian Cup in 2023. Tajikistan won the 2022 edition of King's Cup in Thailand, defeating Malaysia.

Team image

Kit
In September 2017, Tajikistan's kit was supplied by Chinese sporting apparel company Li-Ning. In 2022, Tajikistan switched to having their kit supplied by Italian sporting apparel company Macron.

Home stadium
Tajikistan play their home matches at the Pamir Stadium

Results and fixtures

2022

2023

Coaching staff

Coaching history
Caretaker managers are listed in italics.

 Sharif Nazarov (1992–1994)
 Vladimir Ghulamhaydarov (1994–1995)
 Abdulla Muradov (1996)
 Zair Babayev (1997–1998)
 Sharif Nazarov (1999)
 Salahiddin Ghafurov (2000–2002)
 Sharif Nazarov (2003)
 Zair Babayev (2004)
 Sharif Nazarov (2004–2006)
 Mahmadjan Habibullayev (2007)
 Pulad Qadirov (2008–2011)
  Alimjan Rafiqov (2011–2012)
 Kemal Alispahić (2012)
 Nikola Kavazović (2012–2013)
 Mubin Ergashev (2013)
 Muhsin Muhammadiyev (2013–2015)
 Mubin Ergashev (2015–2016)
 Hakim Fuzaylov (2016–2018)
 Alisher Tuhtayev (2018)
 Usmon Toshev (2018–2021)
 Mubin Ergashev (2021)
 Petar Segrt (2022–present)

Players

Current squad
The following players were called for Tajikistan's friendly match against United Arab Emirates on 25 March 2023, and against Kuwait on 28 March 2023.

Caps and goals updated as of 17 November 2022, after the match against Russia.

Recent call ups
The following players have been called up during the past 12 months.
	

RET

INJ Withdrew due to injury
RET Retired
WTH Withdrawn

Records

Players in bold are still active with Tajikistan.

Most appearances

Top goalscorers

Competitive record

FIFA World Cup

AFC Asian Cup

2010 AFC Challenge Cup was used to determine qualification for the 2011 AFC Asian Cup qualification

AFC Challenge Cup

Asian Games

Football at the Asian Games has been an under-23 tournament since 2002.

RCD Cup/ECO Cup record
1965 to 1974: No international team
1993: Third Place

Other tournaments
1997 West Asian Games: Fourth Place
2005 Islamic Solidarity Games: Group Stage
2019 Intercontinental Cup (India): Runners-up
2022 King's Cup: Champions

ELF Cup
In 2006, Tajikistan took part in the inaugural ELF Cup in Northern Cyprus. This competition was originally intended to be for teams that were not members of FIFA; however, the organisers extended invitations to both Tajikistan and Kyrgyzstan, who were both represented by their national futsal teams. Tajikistan failed to get past the group stage.

Head-to-head record

References

External links
Tajikistan profile at FIFA.com
Tajikistan profile at Ukrainian Football News 
Official Website of Tajikistan Football 

 
Asian national association football teams
AFC Challenge Cup-winning countries